CudaText, from Bosnian-Croatian-Montenegrin-Serbian čuda ("wonders" or "miracles", IPA: [ʧuda]), is a free open source cross-platform native GUI text and source code editor. CudaText supersedes its predecessor SynWrite, no longer under development.

The Core Program 
The core program (i.e. without add-ons/plug-ins) is written in Object Pascal on the Lazarus IDE, which results in low resource requirements and the availability of native builds for FreeBSD, Linux, macOS and Windows. The settings are stored in JSON-files, including one file for the standard settings and another one for user-altered settings, that override the values from the standard settings file.

Add-on system and Python 
CudaText has an add-on system similar to Sublime Text or Atom. It is based on Python (version 3.5 or newer). On Windows, the Python engine is shipped with the program. On Unix-based systems, in order to make use of add-ons, Python has to be installed. The macOS doesn't include it, so it has to be downloaded and installed separately. On macOS the package including the 32-bit version is required. Also CudaText's Check for updates function requires Python.

Types of Add-ons 
CudaText has  13 types of add-ons:
 Code tree icons: Icon set, which is used in Code Tree panel.
 File-type icons: Icon set, which is used in Project Manager panel and on tab captions.
 Toolbar theme: Icon set, which is used on horizontal toolbar.
 Toolbar x icons: Icon set, from which user can choose icons for user-added buttons.
 Sidebar theme: Icon set, which is used on sidebar.
 Lexer: Data file to support syntax highlighting for some language.
 Plugin: Any Python-based extension.
 Snippets: Set of files, which adds code "snippets" for some language, used with Snippets plugin.
 Color theme: Set of colors for CudaText interface and its lexers.
 Translation: Data file to support app localization to some language.
 Linter: Sub-plugin for CudaLint plugin, which enables linting (source code checking) for some language.
 Formatter: Sub-plugin for CudaFormatter plugin, which allows to re-format text for some language.
 Tree helper: Plugin, which shows Code Tree structure for some language.

Examples of add-ons

Plug-in: CudaLint 
This is the linting framework, which is the host for second level plugins, "linters". Each linter is capable to check validity of source code for some syntax. For example, linter based on CppCheck is capable to check C++ source code. Linters analyze source code and find errors/warning in it, and framework displays these warning in the CudaText bottom panel, and adds colored bookmarks for them. Initially, the framework was made based on Sublime Linter plugin for Sublime Text 3. Linters require additional command-line tools installed, e.g. CppCheck, CssLint and others. Sometimes, they require Node.js package.

Plug-in: Sync_Scroll 
Since July 2018 CudaText has a sync scroll plug-in. This plug-in allows parallel scrolling through two text files with synchronised lines, i.e. two tabs in different vertical or horizontal groups display always the lines with the same numbers. This feature is useful for manual comparisons of two files (manual diff) and quite indispensable for manually annotating parallel text corpora.

Plug-in: Text_Statistics 
The text statistics plug-in is a tool for linguists. It displays the number of lines, words, letters and all characters as well as the 30 most common words and the sentences with n words, i.e. a short statistic of the number of sentences with 1 to 9 elements.

Feature List
 Syntax highlighting for all common languages: C, C++, Java, JavaScript, HTML, CSS, PHP, Python, Go, XML; it is supported by "lexers"; more than 200 lexers is created
 Code folding 
 Code tree, i.e. list of functions/classes/etc in the side panel
 Multi-carets
 Multi-selections 
 Search/replace with regular expressions
 Supports many encodings
 Simple auto-completion (fixed list) for some lexers
 Extendable via Python plugins
 Command palette (mimics Sublime Text behaviour)
 Configs in JSON format
 Based on ATSynEdit engine 
 Includes hex viewer for files of unlimited size

Features for HTML/CSS coding:

 Smart auto-completion for HTML, CSS
 HTML tags completion with Tab-key (Snippets plugin)
 HTML color code underlining
 Built-in image viewer
 Tooltip preview for picture files and HTML entities (plugin)

See also
 List of text editors
 Comparison of text editors
 List of HTML editors 
 Comparison of HTML editors

References

External links
 Official website

Free software programmed in Pascal
Cross-platform software
Cross-platform free software
HTML editors
Linux text editors
MacOS text editors
Text editors
Free text editors
Windows text editors
XML editors
Unix text editors
Pascal (programming language) software